Larisa Neiland and Jana Novotná were the defending champions but competed with different partners that year, Neiland with Elizabeth Smylie and Novotná with Arantxa Sánchez Vicario.

Neiland and Smylie lost in the quarterfinals to Novotná and Sánchez Vicario.

Novotná and Sánchez Vicario lost in the semifinals to Patty Fendick and Meredith McGrath.

Gigi Fernández and Natasha Zvereva won in the final 6–3, 6–1 against Fendick and McGrath.

Seeds
Champion seeds are indicated in bold text while text in italics indicates the round in which those seeds were eliminated. All sixteen seeded teams received byes into the second round.

Draw

Finals

Top half

Section 1

Section 2

Bottom half

Section 3

Section 4

External links
 1994 Lipton Championships Women's Doubles Draw

Women's Doubles
Lipton Championships - Women's doubles